Gods Behaving Badly is a 2013 film adaptation of Marie Phillips' 2007 satire novel, Gods Behaving Badly. The film is the feature-length directorial debut of Marc Turtletaub, who is better known as a film producer.

Plot
The film is about a young mortal couple (Alicia Silverstone and Ebon Moss-Bachrach) who encounter a group of Greek gods living in New York City.

Cast
Alicia Silverstone as Kate
Ebon Moss-Bachrach as Neil
Christopher Walken as Zeus
Sharon Stone as Aphrodite
John Turturro as Hades
Edie Falco as Artemis
Oliver Platt as Apollo
Rosie Perez as Persephone
Phylicia Rashad as Demeter
Nelsan Ellis as Dionysus
Gideon Glick as Eros
Laryssa Lauret as Trudy
Henry Zebrowski as Hermes
Will Swenson as Ares

Production
The film was shot during mid-2011. The setting of the story was changed from contemporary London to modern day New York City.

Release
The film was shot in 2011 and premiered at the 2013 Rome Film Festival.

References

External links

Films shot in New York City
2013 films
American comedy-drama films
2013 comedy-drama films
Films based on classical mythology
Films based on British novels
2013 directorial debut films
2010s English-language films
2010s American films